SoftBank Telecom Corporation, previously as Japan Telecom Co. Ltd. (Nippon Terekomu Kabushiki-gaisha) was a Japanese telephone company of the SoftBank group.  It provides services to businesses and consumers in Japan. It provides long-distance telephone service, international call service, and direct connection fixed-line voice service. In addition, it engages in the billing and collecting fees for the telephony service; consulting, development and establishment of telecommunication system; and provision of information processing and providing service. On 1 April 2015 Softbank Telecom Corp. merged into Softbank Mobile Corp. and ceased to exist as a separate entity.

Timeline
1984-10: Japanese Telecom Telegraph was founded.
1986-08: Japanese Telecom Telegraph launches leased circuit services
1986-12: Railway Telecommunication (JR Telecom, or JR Tsushin) established
1989-05: Railway Telecommunication merges with Japan Telecom
2002-08: Company name was changed to Japan Telecom Holdings. The fixed-line telecommunications business was also separated to found a new Japan Telecom.
2006-10: Company name changed to SoftBank Telecom Corporation
2015-04: Company merged into Softbank Mobile Corp.
2018-12: Company goes into IPO

References

External links
 Official website

SoftBank Group